In optics, the optical sine theorem states that the products of the index, height, and sine of the slope angle of a ray in object space and its corresponding ray in image space are equal. That is:

External links
http://physics.tamuk.edu/~suson/html/4323/aberatn.html#Optical%20Sine

Sine theorem
Physics theorems